Maria Garland (16 May 1889 – 26 October 1967) was a Danish stage and film actress.

Selected filmography

Verdensgiften - 1914
Professor Petersens Plejebørn - 1924 
En kæreste for meget - 1924 
Kraft og skønhed - 1928 
Kys, klap og kommers - 1929 
Nyhavn 17 - 1933
Lynet - 1934
Flight from the Millions - 1934
Nøddebo Præstegård - 1934
Barken Margrethe af Danmark - 1934
København, Kalundborg og - ? - 1934
Prisoner Number One- 1935
Mille, Marie og mig - 1937
I dag begynder livet - 1939
Familien Olsen - 1940
Pas på svinget i Solby - 1940
Tror du jeg er født i går? - 1941
Far skal giftes - 1941
Søren Søndervold - 1942
Forellen - 1942
Frøken Vildkat - 1942
Alle mand på dæk - 1942
Et skud før midnat - 1942
Ebberød Bank - 1943
Det brændende spørgsmål - 1943
Hans onsdagsveninde - 1943
En pige uden lige - 1943
Mine kære koner - 1943
To som elsker hinanden - 1944
Den usynlige hær - 1945
Ditte Menneskebarn - 1946
Soldaten og Jenny - 1947
Mani - 1947
Lykke på rejsen - 1947
 The Swedenhielm Family - 1947
Mens porten var lukket - 1948
Vi vil ha' et barn - 1949
De røde heste - 1950
Dorte - 1951
Hold fingrene fra mor - 1951
Det gamle guld - 1951
Husmandstøsen - 1952
Sønnen - 1953
Hejrenæs - 1953
Sukceskomponisten - 1954
Min datter Nelly - 1955
Det lille hotel - 1958
Mor skal giftes - 1958
Baronessen fra benzintanken - 1960
Komtessen - 1961
Den rige enke - 1962
Hvis lille pige er du? - 1963
Gys og gæve tanter - 1966
Tre små piger - 1966

References

External links

Danish stage actresses
Danish film actresses
Danish silent film actresses
20th-century Danish actresses
Actresses from Copenhagen
1889 births
1967 deaths